"My City Was Gone" is a song by the rock group The Pretenders. The song originally appeared in October 1982 as the B-side to the single release of "Back on the Chain Gang"; the single was the first release for the band following the death of founding bandmember James Honeyman-Scott. The song was included on the album Learning to Crawl, which was released in early 1984, and it became a radio favorite in the United States. It is sometimes referred to as "The Ohio Song" for its constant reference to the state.

The song was written by Pretenders leader Chrissie Hynde, and reflected her growing interest in environmental and social concerns. The lyrics take the form of an autobiographical lament, with the singer returning to her childhood home of Ohio and discovering that rampant development had destroyed the "pretty countryside" of her youth. The song makes a number of specific references to places in and around Akron, Ohio including South Howard Street (line 5), the historic center of Akron which was leveled to make way for an urban plaza with three skyscrapers and two parking decks (line 8).

The opening bass riff from this song "was something that Tony Butler used to play just as a warm-up," said Steve Churchyard, the engineer for the record.

Ultimate Classic Rock critic Matt Wardlaw rated it the Pretenders all-time 4th greatest song, saying that it was inspired by "Hynde returning home after first finding success with the Pretenders and lamenting the many changes for the worse in her beloved former hometown." Ultimate Classic Rock critic Bryan Wawzenek rated it as drummer Martin Chambers' 4th best Pretenders songs, saying that the beat is "so simple, so stark, so basic – it’s brilliant."

Use by the EIB Network
The instrumental opening of the song (before Hynde's vocals appear at 36 seconds in) is best known as the opening theme of the EIB Network, an American conservative talk radio franchise that started in 1984 with Rush Limbaugh and since June 2021 has been hosted by Clay Travis and Buck Sexton.  

The roots derive from with Rush Limbaugh hosting a local radio show at KFBK in Sacramento, California in 1984, where the show stayed until 1988 when it became nationally syndicated under the EIB Network brand. Limbaugh said in 2011 that he chose it because of the irony of a conservative using such an anti-conservative song, though he mainly liked its "unmistakable, totally recognizable bass line."

In 1999, Rolling Stone magazine reported that, according to Hynde's manager, neither KFBK (which owned the show prior to national syndication) nor Limbaugh had licensed the song nor asked permission to use it. According to Rolling Stone, EMI took action after Limbaugh told a pair of reporters in 1997 that "it was icing on the cake that it was [written by] an environmentalist, animal rights wacko and was an anti-conservative song.  It is anti-development, anti-capitalist and here I am going to take a liberal song and make fun of [liberals] at the same time." EMI issued a cease and desist request that Limbaugh stop using the song, which he did.  When Hynde found out during a radio interview, she said that her parents loved and listened to Limbaugh and she did not mind its use. A usage payment was agreed upon which she donated to PETA. She later wrote to the organization saying, "In light of Rush Limbaugh's vocal support of PETA's campaign against the Environmental Protection Agency's foolish plan to test some 3,000 chemicals on animals, I have decided to allow him to keep my song, 'My City Was Gone', as his signature tune..." After a one-year transition, Travis and Sexton allowed its license on "My City Was Gone" to lapse and began using "My Own Worst Enemy" by Lit.

Personnel
Chrissie Hynde – lead vocals, rhythm guitar
Martin Chambers – drums
Billy Bremner – lead guitar
Tony Butler – bass guitar

References

External links
Lyrics to My City Was Gone

1982 songs
The Pretenders songs
Songs about the United States
The Rush Limbaugh Show
Songs written by Chrissie Hynde
Song recordings produced by Chris Thomas (record producer)
Sire Records singles
Music of Ohio
Songs about Ohio